Miriam Katherine McDonald (born July 26, 1987) is a Canadian actress best known for playing the lead role Emma Nelson on the television series Degrassi: The Next Generation.

Career
McDonald focused on acting, playing a role in the series, System Crash, in 1999. McDonald found a job as a voiceover actress, after she was cast in 2001 in John Kricfalusi's series The Ripping Friends. She has done a total of 39 characters.

In 2001, she was cast as Emma Nelson in the CTV/The N drama Degrassi: The Next Generation, a spin-off of the successful Degrassi series. She starred for all nine seasons that bore the title.

In 2004, she played Dawn Gensler in the made-for-television movie She's Too Young. She also had a guest role on the Family Channel show Naturally, Sadie as Heidi.

In 2008, she played Danielle "Daisy" Brooks in the made-for-TV erotic-thriller movie, Poison Ivy: The Secret Society.

In 2013, she played two roles in Lost Girl and also made an appearance in Orphan Black.

In 2018, McDonald appeared in Drake's music video for "I'm Upset", which took place during a Degrassi reunion.

McDonald is also a dancer and yoga instructor, and has worked as a real estate agent.

Filmography

References

External links

1987 births
Living people
20th-century Canadian actresses
21st-century Canadian actresses
Actresses from Ontario
Canadian child actresses
Canadian female dancers
Canadian television actresses
Canadian voice actresses
People from Oakville, Ontario
Yoga teachers